Pablo Garza (born September 16, 1983) is an American mixed martial artist currently competing in the Featherweight division. He has competed for the UFC, WEC, and was a contestant on The Ultimate Fighter: Team GSP vs. Team Koscheck.

Background
Garza was born in Wasco, California to parents who both emigrated from Mexico. Garza and his family moved to North Dakota, where he attended high school and played baseball, basketball, and track. He continued to play basketball in college for two years at the University of Jamestown, as a point guard. He eventually earned a degree in exercise science and personal training at the University of North Dakota. While Garza was in college, he worked two jobs at a factory making windmill blades and also did an internship at a gym.

Early career
Garza trains out of Dylan Spicers' MMA gym the Academy of Combat Arts in Fargo, North Dakota, as well as the Academy in Brooklyn Center, Minnesota with the likes of Jacob Volkmann, Nik Lentz, Pat Barry and coach Greg Nelson.
Garza is a predominantly ground-based muay thai fighter, where he has managed to secure several submission victories. A Fargo, North Dakota-based Mexican American from Grafton, North Dakota,

Prior to joining the UFC, Garza appeared for promotions such as King of the Cage and Brutal Fight Night.

The Ultimate Fighter
Garza then signed with the Ultimate Fighting Championship to appear on The Ultimate Fighter: Team GSP vs. Team Koscheck.

In the debut episode, Garza lost to touted prospect Michael Johnson in a two-round decision.

Outside promotions
After leaving the UFC, Garza fought in smaller, outside promotions. Before his Ultimate Fighter fight with Michael Johnson had even aired on television, Garza faced William Joplin, winning via unanimous decision. The fight, which was predominantly stand-up based, saw Garza break the nose of Joplin, before taking control of the fight.

Garza then faced Aaron Steele on September 11, 2010. In preparation for the fight, Garza visited Minnesota Martial Arts Academy, training with Sean Sherk, Jacob Volkmann and Greg Nelson. Garza went on to win the fight via TKO (punches) late in the third round.

World Extreme Cagefighting
Garza was then signed by the UFC's sister promotion, World Extreme Cagefighting. Replacing Jason Reinhardt, Garza stepped up to face Tiequan Zhang on the undercard of WEC 51 on 5 days notice. He lost the fight via submission in the first round.

Ultimate Fighting Championship
In October 2010, World Extreme Cagefighting merged with the Ultimate Fighting Championship. As part of the merger, all WEC fighters were transferred to the UFC.

Garza made his UFC and featherweight debut against Fredson Paixão at The Ultimate Fighter: Team GSP vs. Team Koscheck Finale. This was the first ever featherweight fight in the UFC. Garza knocked Paixão out 51 seconds into the first round with a flying knee. After being unconscious for nearly two minutes, Paixão was on his back for close to four minutes while being given oxygen, before being placed in a neck brace and carried out on a stretcher. Garza earned Knockout of the Night honors for the performance.

Garza defeated Yves Jabouin on April 30, 2011 at UFC 129 via first round submission due to a flying triangle choke. The finish earned him Submission of the Night honors and $129,000.

Garza faced Dustin Poirier on November 12, 2011 at UFC on Fox 1. He lost the fight in the second round after tapping out to a d'arce choke.

Garza next faced Dennis Bermudez at UFC on Fox 3 on May 5, 2012. He lost the fight via unanimous decision (30-27, 30-27, 30-27).

Garza was expected to face Josh Grispi on August 4, 2012 at UFC on FOX 4. However, Garza was forced out of the bout with an injury and replaced by Rani Yahya.

Garza faced Mark Hominick on November 17, 2012 at UFC 154. He won the fight by unanimous decision.

Garza faced Diego Brandão on April 6, 2013 at UFC on Fuel TV 9. He lost the fight via first round submission and was subsequently released from the promotion.

Post UFC
Shortly after his release from the UFC, Garza relocated to Oslo, Norway. It was expected that he would receive offers from the elite European MMA promotions such as Britain's Cage Warriors and BAMMA or Sweden's Superior Challenge. However, Garza has not competed since his release from the UFC.

Mixed martial arts record

|-
| Loss
| align=center| 12–4
| Diego Brandão
| Submission (arm-triangle choke)
| UFC on Fuel TV: Mousasi vs. Latifi
| 
| align=center| 1
| align=center| 3:27
| Stockholm, Sweden
| 
|-
| Win
| align=center| 12–3
| Mark Hominick
| Decision (unanimous)
| UFC 154
| 
| align=center| 3
| align=center| 5:00
| Montreal, Quebec, Canada
| 
|-
| Loss
| align=center| 11–3
| Dennis Bermudez
| Decision (unanimous)
| UFC on Fox: Diaz vs. Miller
| 
| align=center| 3
| align=center| 5:00
| East Rutherford, New Jersey, United States
| 
|-
| Loss
| align=center| 11–2
| Dustin Poirier
| Submission (D'Arce choke)
| UFC on Fox: Velasquez vs. dos Santos
| 
| align=center| 2
| align=center| 1:32
| Anaheim, California, United States
| 
|-
| Win
| align=center| 11–1
| Yves Jabouin
| Submission (flying triangle choke)
| UFC 129
| 
| align=center| 1
| align=center| 4:31
| Toronto, Ontario, Canada
| 
|-
| Win
| align=center| 10–1
| Fredson Paixão
| KO (flying knee)
| The Ultimate Fighter 12 Finale
| 
| align=center| 1
| align=center| 0:51
| Las Vegas, Nevada, United States
| 
|-
| Loss
| align=center| 9–1
| Zhang Tiequan
| Submission (guillotine choke)
| WEC 51
| 
| align=center| 1
| align=center| 2:26
| Broomfield, Colorado, United States
| 
|-
| Win
| align=center| 9–0
| Aaron Steele
| TKO (punches)
| Crowbar MMA: Fall Brawl
| 
| align=center| 3
| align=center| 2:57
| Fargo, North Dakota, United States
| 
|-
| Win
| align=center| 8–0
| William Joplin
| Decision (unanimous)
| The Cage Inc.: Battle at the Border 6
| 
| align=center| 3
| align=center| 5:00
| Hankinson, North Dakota, United States
| 
|-
| Win
| align=center| 7–0
| Nate Bell
| Submission (punches)
| KOTC: Ice Age
| 
| align=center| 1
| align=center| 1:00
| Mahnomen, Minnesota, United States
| 
|-
| Win
| align=center| 6–0
| Jayson Fuentes
| Submission (rear-naked choke)
| EB: Beatdown at 4 Bears 6
| 
| align=center| 2
| align=center| 4:54
| New Town, North Dakota, United States
| 
|-
| Win
| align=center| 5–0
| Caleb Wolff
| Submission (armbar)
| Brutaal Fight Night: All American Cage Fighting
| 
| align=center| 1
| align=center| 3:37
| Bismarck, North Dakota, United States
| 
|-
| Win
| align=center| 4–0
| Mitch Jackson
| Submission (triangle choke)
| Max Fights 6
| 
| align=center| 1
| align=center| 0:53
| Fargo, North Dakota, United States
| 
|-
| Win
| align=center| 3–0
| Jonathan Knutson
| Decision (unanimous)
| EB: Beatdown at 4 Bears 4
| 
| align=center| 3
| align=center| 5:00
| New Town, North Dakota, United States
| 
|-
| Win
| align=center| 2–0
| Tyler Larson
| Submission (kimura)
| Max Fights 4
| 
| align=center| 1
| align=center| 3:38
| Fargo, North Dakota, United States
| 
|-
| Win
| align=center| 1–0
| Mike Davis
| Submission (guillotine choke)
| KO: Productions
| 
| align=center| 1
| align=center| 0:38
| Grand Forks, North Dakota, United States
|

References

External links
Official UFC Profile

Mixed martial artists from North Dakota
American mixed martial artists of Mexican descent
Featherweight mixed martial artists
Lightweight mixed martial artists
Mixed martial artists utilizing Brazilian jiu-jitsu
Living people
1983 births
American practitioners of Brazilian jiu-jitsu
Sportspeople from Fargo, North Dakota
People from Wasco, California
Ultimate Fighting Championship male fighters